The Essex-Orleans Senate District was one of 13 Vermont Senate districts included in the redistricting and reapportionment plan developed by the Vermont General Assembly following the 2010 U.S. Census. The plan applies to legislatures elected in 2012, 2014, 2016, 2018, and 2020. Following the 2020 U.S. Census the district was divided into two for Essex County and Orleans County. 

The Essex-Orleans district includes all of Essex County, Orleans County, and some parts of others.

As of the 2010 census, the state as a whole had a population of 625,741. As there are a total of 30 senators, there were 20,858 residents per senator. 

As of the 2000 census, the state as a whole had a population of 608,827. As there are a total of 30 Senators, there were 20,294 residents per senator.  The Essex-Orleans District had a population of 38,657 in that same census.  The district is apportioned two senators. This equals 19,329 residents per senator, 4.76% below the state average.

District Senators 
As of 2020:
Russ Ingalls, Republican
Robert A. Starr, Democrat

Towns and cities in the Essex-Orleans District, 2002–2012 elections

Essex County 

 Averill
 Averys Gore
 Bloomfield
 Brighton
 Brunswick
 Canaan
 Concord
 East Haven
 Ferdinand
 Granby
 Guildhall
 Lemington
 Lewis
 Lunenburg
 Maidstone
 Norton
 Victory
 Warners Grant
 Warren Gore

Franklin County 

 Montgomery
 Richford

Lamoille County 

 Eden
 Wolcott

Orleans County 

 Albany
 Barton
 Brownington
 Charleston
 Coventry
 Craftsbury
 Derby
 Glover
 Greensboro
 Holland
 Irasburg
 Jay
 Lowell
 Morgan
 Newport
 Newport Town
 Troy
 Westfield
 Westmore

References

External links 

 Redistricting information from Vermont Legislature
 2002 and 2012 Redistricting information from Vermont Legislature
 Map of Vermont Senate districts and statistics (PDF) 2002–2012

Vermont Senate districts